is the 12th studio album by Japanese idol duo Wink, released by Polystar on July 1, 1994. It features the singles "Itsumademo Suki de Itakute" and "Twinkle Twinkle". This is the duo's first album to not include a cover song. In addition, Overture! marks a change in musical direction from dance-pop to a 1960s-style pop sound.

The album peaked at No. 34 on Oricon's albums chart and sold over 23,000 copies.

Track listing

Charts

References

External links 
 
 
 

1994 albums
Wink (duo) albums
Japanese-language albums